Le Cygne: Journal of the International Marie de France Society is a scholarly journal, published annually in the fall, by the International Marie de France Society. The journal's publishes two to three articles in each volume except for special issues and the primary focus is Marie de France, her works, and the anonymous lays.

It is included in the Modern Language Association International Bibliography database.

References

External links
 http://www.mariedefrancesociety.org/le-cygne/

History journals
French-language journals
Annual journals
English-language journals